The Alchemist is a novel by Brazilian author Paulo Coelho which was first published in 1988. Originally written in Portuguese, it became a widely translated international bestseller. An allegorical novel, The Alchemist follows a young Andalusian shepherd in his journey to the pyramids of Egypt, after having a recurring dream of finding a treasure there.

Plot
An Andalusian shepherd boy named Santiago dreams of a treasure while in a ruined church. He consults a Gypsy fortune-teller about the meaning of the recurring dream. The woman interprets it as a prophecy, telling the boy that he will discover a treasure at the Egyptian pyramids.

After Santiago sets out, he meets an old king Melchizedek, or the king of Salem, who tells him to sell his sheep so as to travel to Egypt and accomplish his 'Personal Legend'. Early on his arrival in Africa, a man who claims to be able to take Santiago to the pyramids instead robs him of the money he had made from his flock. Santiago then has to work for a crystal merchant to earn enough to get to the pyramids.

Along the way, the boy meets an Englishman who has come in search of an alchemist and continues his travels with his new companion. When they reach an oasis, Santiago meets and falls in love with an Arabian girl named Fatima, to whom he proposes marriage. She promises to marry him only after he completes his journey. Frustrated at first, he later learns that true love will not stop nor must one sacrifice one's destiny to it, since to do so robs it of truth.

The boy then encounters a wise alchemist, who teaches him to realize his true self. Together, they risk a journey through the territory of warring tribes, where Santiago is forced to demonstrate his oneness with the 'Soul of the World' by turning himself into a dust storm before he is allowed to proceed. 

When he reaches the pyramids and begins digging, he is robbed by thieves, who ask him what he is digging for; he replies that a dream has led him to buried treasure. The thieves scoff, and the leader remarks about a dream he once had about treasure under a tree at a ruined church. Santiago realizes the treasure he sought was where he had his original dream all along.

Background
Coelho wrote The Alchemist in only two weeks in 1987. He explained that he was able to write at this pace because the story was "already written in [his] soul."

The book's main theme is about finding one's destiny, although according to The New York Times, The Alchemist is "more self-help than literature". The advice given to Santiago that "when you really want something to happen, the whole universe will conspire so that your wish comes true" is the core of the novel's philosophy and a motif that plays throughout it. 

The Alchemist was first released by Rocco, an obscure Brazilian publishing house. Despite its having sold "well," the publisher after a year decided to give Coelho back the rights. Needing to "heal" himself from this setback, Coelho set out to leave Rio de Janeiro with his wife and spent 40 days in the Mojave Desert. Returning from the excursion, Coelho decided he had to keep on struggling and was "so convinced it was a great book that [he] started knocking on doors."

The plot of the novel builds on the international folktale type classified as no. 1645 ("The Treasure at Home") in the Aarne–Thompson–Uther Index of folktales: "A man dreams that if he goes to a distant city he will find treasure on a certain bridge. Finding no treasure, he tells his dream to a man who says that he too has dreamed of treasure at certain place. He describes the place, which is the first man's home. When the latter returns home he finds the treasure." The earliest known version of this tale type is a poem by the 13th century Persian poet Rumi and a variant of the tale appears in the One Thousand and One Nights collection of Arabic folktales.

Adaptations

In 1994, a comic adaptation was published by Alexandre Jubran. HarperOne, a HarperCollins imprint, produced an illustrated version of the novel, with paintings by the French artist Mœbius, but failed to convince Coelho "to consent to the full graphic-novel treatment." The Alchemist: A Graphic Novel was published in 2010, adapted by Derek Ruiz and with artwork by Daniel Sampere.

The Alchemist's Symphony by the young Walter Taieb was released in 1997 with the support of Paulo Coelho, who wrote an original text for the CD booklet. The work has eight movements and five interludes.

In 2002, a theatrical adaptation of The Alchemist was produced and performed in London. Since then there have been several productions by the Cornish Collective. A later London performance was visited by the producer Ashvin Gidwani who, finding it "verbose but colourful", decided to commission a new 90-minute version of the book from Deepa Gahlot for the Indian stage. This was eventually launched in 2009.

In 2006, Mistaken Identity, a Singapore indie rock band, adapted the story of the novel into what they claimed was "essentially our attempt at writing a musical" and released the track as "The Alchemist". Kochavva Paulo Ayyappa Coelho, an Indian Malayalam-language film written and directed by Sidhartha Siva, has its title inspired by novelist Paulo Coelho, and a central theme is inspired from The Alchemist.

In July 2021, Will Smith announced that he had acquired the film option rights to the novel. However, setbacks on the project have made its status unclear.

References

External links

 The Alchemist at Sparknotes

1988 Brazilian novels
Allegory
Brazilian fantasy novels
Brazilian novels adapted into plays
Novels by Paulo Coelho
Portuguese-language novels
Fiction about alchemy
HarperCollins books
Novels set in Tangier
Novels about dreams